Albert Einstein (1879–1955) was a German-born theoretical physicist.

Einstein may also refer to:
 Einstein (surname), a surname (including a list of people with the name)

Science and technology
 Einstein Observatory, the first fully imaging X-ray telescope put into orbit
 Einstein (US-CERT program), an intrusion detection program used by the United States Department of Homeland Security
 Einstein Telescope, a gravitational wave detector under design
 Einstein Tower, an astrophysical observatory in Potsdam, Germany
 Einstein (unit), a unit of measurement defined primarily as one mole of photons
 Tatung Einstein, a personal computer produced by Taiwanese corporation Tatung

Places
 2001 Einstein, a main belt asteroid
 Einstein (crater), a large lunar crater
 Mount Einstein in Alaska
 Mount Einstein in the Paparoa Range in New Zealand

Fictional characters
 Einstein (Farscape), a character in the science fiction television series Farscape
 Einstein (dog), canine pet of Doc Brown in the Back to the Future movie trilogy
 Albert Einstein, a character in the television series Alien Nation
 Einstein, a Great Dane in the 1988 film Oliver & Company
 Nina Einstein, a character from the anime series Code Geass
 Agent Einstein, a character in the tenth season of the television series The X-Files
 Carl Brutananadilewski, known as the Gridiron Einstein from the animated series Aqua Teen Hunger Force.

Television
 Einstein (film), a 2008 biographical TV movie about Albert Einstein
 Einstein (German TV series), a German series
 Einstein (Swiss TV series), a Swiss television scientific infotainment serial
 Einstein, the first season of the American series Genius

Other uses
 "Einstein" (Kelly Clarkson song), from her 2011 album Stronger
 Einstein (game), a toy similar to the Simon made in 1979 by the Castle Toy Co.
 Einstein Prize (disambiguation), several awards named after Albert Einstein
 Einstein (horse), a Thoroughbred race horse
Einstein, a 1974 opera by Paul Dessau

See also
 Albert Einstein (disambiguation)
 Einstein problem, a mathematical problem about periodic tilings
 Einstein@Home, a distributed computing project
 Einstein Bros. Bagels, a bagel and coffee chain in the United States